Samuela Vunisa (born 19/08/1988, Suva, Fiji) is a Fijian-born Italian professional rugby union player. Powerful and athletic, Vunisa is an option across the back-row due to the combination of his speed, ball-carrying ability, physical strength and ability at the breakdown.

Rugby Union career

Amateur career

His career began in 2009, where he played for New Zealand side Taranaki in the first tier domestic competition in the country, the ITM Cup.

He went on loan in the 2011-12 rugby season to Rugby Calvisano in Italy, and impressed as his team won the top level domestic league and the Excellence Trophy.

In the Summer of 2012, he returned to Taranaki. However, after negotiations lasting several weeks, the coach of Rugby Calvisano, Andrea Cavinato, announced in an interview with newspaper Giornale di Brescia in July 2012 of having reached an agreement for the termination of Vunisa's contract with Taranaki, allowing him to return to Calvisano for the 2012-13 season.

Vunisa has been drafted to Marr in the Scottish Premiership for the 2017-18 season.

Vunisa signed back with Rugby Calvisano for season 2018-19.

Professional career

In the summer of 2013 he was signed by Zebre, one of the two professional Italian clubs. Zebre played in the Pro12, a multi-national league.

He later signed for Saracens in the Aviva Premiership in England.

On 26 May 2017 it was announced that Vunisa would sign for the Glasgow Warriors. He signed a two-year deal until 2019. He made 5 appearances for the Warriors scoring one try. He left the club at the end of the 2017-18 season.

International career

He played underage rugby for both the Fijian National Under-19 and Under-20 teams.

He qualified for the Italy national rugby union team in Autumn 2014 under the IRB 3-year residency rule, and was called up into the squad for the 2014 Autumn Rugby Internationals, winning his first cap on 22 November 2014 against South Africa national rugby union team. Italy national rugby union team were in contention for most of the game but conceded two late tries to lose 22-6.

References

1988 births
Living people
Fijian rugby union players
Rugby union flankers
Italian rugby union players
Italy international rugby union players
Fijian expatriate rugby union players
Expatriate rugby union players in England
Sportspeople from Suva
I-Taukei Fijian people
People educated at Whanganui Collegiate School
Glasgow Warriors players
Saracens F.C. players
Marr RFC players
Rugby Calvisano players
People educated at Suva Grammar School